SFIA may refer to:

 San Francisco International Airport, in the United States
 Skills Framework for the Information Age, originating from the United Kingdom, now established as the de facto global IT and digital skills framework
 SfiA, aka SulA, an SOS response protein
 Science & Futurism with Isaac Arthur